Talal Ouahabi (born 1 August 1978) is a Moroccan former professional tennis player.

Ouahabi, who had a career best singles ranking of 382, appeared twice in the main draw of the Grand Prix Hassan II tournament on the ATP Tour and won six ITF Futures titles.

A Moroccan representative at the 1999 Pan Arab Games, Ouahabi was a member of the Morocco Davis Cup team from 2005 to 2011. He featured in a total of 10 ties, for three singles and two doubles wins.

ITF Futures titles

Singles: (6)

Doubles: (5)

See also
List of Morocco Davis Cup team representatives

References

External links
 
 
 

1978 births
Living people
Moroccan male tennis players